The Chairman's Handicap is an Australian Turf Club Group 2 Thoroughbred quality handicap horse race for horses three years old and older, held over a distance of 2600 metres at Randwick Racecourse, Sydney, Australia in April. Prizemoney is A$300,000.
The winner of this race is exempt from ballot and penalty in weights for the ATC Sydney Cup.

History

Name
 1979–2011 - Chairman's Handicap
 2012–2013 - Chairman's Quality
 2014–2017 - Chairman's Handicap
 2018 onwards - Chairman's Quality

Grade
 1979–2001 - Group 3
 2002 onwards - Group 2

Distance
 1979–1999 - 2600 metres
 2000–2003 - 2400 metres
2004 onwards - 2600 metres

Chairman's Handicap - Sydney Cup
The race is traditionally a lead up for the Sydney Cup which is run one week later.  The following horses have won the Chairman's Handicap - Sydney Cup double in the same year:
 1986 - Marooned
 1987 - Major Drive
 1990 - King Aussie
 1997 - Linesman
 2002 - Henderson Bay
 2008 - No Wine No Song
 2010 - Jessicabeel
 2014 - The Offer

Winners

 2022 - Nerve Not Verve
 2021 - Quick Thinker
 2020 - Raheen House
 2019 - Gallic Chieftain
 2018 - Sir Charles Road
 2017 - Big Duke
 2016 - Libran
 2015 - Tremec
 2014 - The Offer
 2013 - Tremec
 2012 - Permit
 2011 - Once Were Wild
 2010 - Jessicabeel
 2009 - Divine Rebel
 2008 - No Wine No Song
 2007 - No Wine No Song
 2006 - Fooram
 2005 - Philosophe
 2004 - Mummify
 2003 - Grey Song
 2002 - Henderson Bay
 2001 - Steel Phoenix
 2000 - Pravda
 1999 - Steel Phoenix
 1998 - Joss Sticks
 1997 - Linesman
 1996 - Cornwall King
 1995 - Spiritual Star
 1994 - Paris Fire
 1993 - Te Akau Nick
 1992 - Demerit
 1991 - Prizaan
 1990 - King Aussie
 1989 - Just Trish
 1988 - Round The World
 1987 - Major Drive
 1986 - Marooned
 1985 - Duanette's Girl
 1984 - What A Nuisance
 1983 - Lord Mop
 1982 - Bianco Lady
 1981 - Gatcombe
 1980 - Just Jealous
 1979 - Lady Dignitas

Notes:
  Date of race rescheduled due to postponement of the Easter Saturday meeting because of the heavy track conditions. The meeting was moved to Easter Monday, 6 April 2015.

See also
 List of Australian Group races
 Group races

External links 
First three placegetters Chairman's Handicap (ATC)

References

Horse races in Australia
Randwick Racecourse
Recurring sporting events established in 1979
1979 establishments in Australia